Henry Houston may refer to:

 Henry A. Houston (1847–1925), American teacher, businessman and politician
 Henry H. Houston (1820–1895), American businessman and philanthropist